Günter Zeitler is a German handballer, who competed for the SC Dynamo Berlin / Sportvereinigung (SV) Dynamo. He won the silver medal at the world championships, 1966.

References 

German male handball players
Possibly living people
Year of birth missing
Place of birth missing